Tujetsch is a municipality in the Surselva Region in the canton of Graubünden in Switzerland. It is the westernmost municipality of the canton, connected to Urseren (canton of Uri) by the Oberalp Pass.

History

The upper Surselva was first settled in the 9th century, following the foundation of Disentis Abbey, as part of the Cadi (feudal possessions of the abbey). In the 12th century, the Walser migrated across Oberalp Pass. Sedrun parish church was first consecrated in 1205. Both Romansh and Walser communities lived exclusively in dispersed settlements well into the early modern period. The Walser were mostly Romanized, but some Alemannic toponymy remains on the left bank of the Rhine. In the 18th century, villages formed in the vicinity of parish churches, and most of the 66 scattered settlements recorded in the 16th century were abandoned. Sedrun became the main settlement and municipal capital. The economic focus shifted from alpine agriculture to the production of soapstone stoves and pottery. Population fell to below 900 people in the second half of the 19th century due to emigration. The development of the tourism industry in the first half of the 20th century resulted in moderate population growth, to 1,122 as of 1950.
Ski tourism and hydroelectricity were developed in the 1950s to 1960s.

Tujetsch was never the name of a village. As the name of the valley, Thiuesch is first recorded in 1237. The local variety of the Romansh language is markedly different from standard Sursilvan and is sometimes listed as a separate dialect, Tuatschin. The Tavetsch breed of sheep closely resembled Neolithic era livestock. The breed was extinct in 1954, and a breeding back project was initiated in 1984. The official name of the municipality was Tavetsch until 1976.

Geography

Of this area, 25.7% is used for agricultural purposes, while 10.8% is forested. 1.4% is settled (buildings or roads) while the remainder (62%) is non-productive (rivers, glaciers or mountains).

Before 2017, the municipality was located in the Disentis sub-district of the Surselva district, after 2017 it was part of the Surselva Region.  It is located at the entrance to the Oberalp Pass and at the source of the Vorderrhein river.  It consists of the village of Sedrun, the sections of Tschamut, Selva, Rueras/Dieni, Camischolas/Zarcuns, Gonda and Bugnei on the left bank of the Vorderrhein, and on the right bank are the settlements of Surrein and Cavorgia.  Until 1920 there was no direct route between the village halves on each bank of the Vorderrhein.  Until 1976 Tujetsch was known as Tavetsch.

Demographics

, 29.1% of the population was made up of foreign nationals. Over the last 10 years the population has grown at a rate of 25.1%. Most of the population speaks Romansh (66.2%), with German being second most common (19.7%) and Italian being third (2.6%).

, the gender distribution of the population was 60.2% male and 39.8% female.  The age distribution, in Tujetsch is; 141 children or 9.2% of the population are between 0 and 9 years old and 181 teenagers or 11.9% are between 10 and 19.  Of the adult population, 189 people or 12.4% of the population are between 20 and 29 years old.  251 people or 16.5% are between 30 and 39, 243 people or 15.9% are between 40 and 49, and 209 people or 13.7% are between 50 and 59.  The senior population distribution is 149 people or 9.8% of the population are between 60 and 69 years old, 108 people or 7.1% are between 70 and 79, there are 45 people or 3.0% who are between 80 and 89 there are 8 people or 0.5% who are between 90 and 99, and 1 person who is 100 or more.

In the 2007 federal election the most popular party was the CVP which received 55.5% of the vote.  The next three most popular parties were the SVP (27%), the SP (11.6%) and the FDP (4.6%).

In Tujetsch about 59.9% of the population (between age 25–64) have completed either non-mandatory upper secondary education or additional higher education (either university or a Fachhochschule).

Tujetsch has an unemployment rate of 1.57%.  , there were 56 people employed in the primary economic sector and about 26 businesses involved in this sector.  177 people are employed in the secondary sector and there are 19 businesses in this sector.  389 people are employed in the tertiary sector, with 66 businesses in this sector.

Of the rest of the population, there are 23 individuals (or about 1.51% of the population) who belong to the Orthodox Church, and there are 6 individuals (or about 0.39% of the population) who belong to another Christian church. There are 63 (or about 4.13% of the population) who are Muslims. There are 5 individuals (or about 0.33% of the population) who belong to another church (not listed on the census), 31 (or about 2.03% of the population) belong to no church, are agnostic or atheist, and 33 individuals (or about 2.16% of the population) did not answer the question.

The historical population is given in the following table:

 Population increase during construction of a power plant.

Climate

Notable people
 Felix Maria Diogg (1762–1834), Classicism portrait painter

See also
 Porta Alpina, a proposed railway station in the Gotthard Base Tunnel (an important rail tunnel running beneath the Alps).

References

External links
Official website 

 
Municipalities of Graubünden
Ski areas and resorts in Switzerland
Populated places on the Rhine